Mitchell Joseph Swepson (born 4 October 1993) is an Australian cricketer. A leg-spin bowler, he made his international debut for the Australia cricket team in June 2018, and plays for Queensland and the Brisbane Heat in Australian domestic cricket.

Domestic career
Swepson made his List A debut for Cricket Australia XI on 5 October 2015 in the 2015–16 Matador BBQs One-Day Cup. He made his first-class debut for Cricket Australia XI on 29 October 2015 in a tour match against New Zealanders as part of New Zealand's tour to Australia. On 10 January 2016 he made his Twenty20 debut for the Brisbane Heat in the 2015–16 Big Bash League.

In November 2019, during the 2019–20 Sheffield Shield season match against Victoria, Swepson took a hat-trick in the first innings.

International career
In January 2017 he was named in Australia's Test squad for their series against India, but he did not play. In August 2017, he was added to Australia's Test squad for their tour to Bangladesh, but he did not play. In May 2018, he was named in Australia's Twenty20 International (T20I) squad for the one-off match against England. He made his T20I debut for Australia against England on 27 June 2018. In December 2019, Swepson was added to Australia's Test squad for the third Test against New Zealand.

In November 2020, Swepson was named in Australia's Test squad for their series against India. In January 2021, Swepson was named in Australia's Test squad for their series against South Africa. In June 2021, Swepson was named in Australia's limited overs squad for their tours of the West Indies and Bangladesh.

In August 2021, Swepson was named in Australia's squad for the 2021 ICC Men's T20 World Cup. In November 2021, Swepson was named in Australia's Test squad for the 2021–22 Ashes series. In February 2022, Swepson was again named in Australia's Test squad, this time for their series against Pakistan. He made his Test debut in March 2022, in the second Test against Pakistan. During the same tour, Swepson was also added to Australia's One Day International (ODI) squad, replacing Steve Smith. He made his ODI debut on 29 March 2022, for Australia against Pakistan.

References

External links

1993 births
Living people
Australian cricketers
Australia Test cricketers
Australia One Day International cricketers
Australia Twenty20 International cricketers
Brisbane Heat cricketers
Cricket Australia XI cricketers
Queensland cricketers
Place of birth missing (living people)